Love Cheque Charge is a 2014 Taiwanese romantic-fantasy comedy television series produced by Sanlih E-Television. Starring George Hu and Phoebe Yuan as the main leads, with KunDa Hsieh, Jay Shih, Smile Weng, Jet Chao and Jessie Chang as the main supporting cast. The Chinese title literally translates to "Happiness Coupon", which is in reference to the promise between the two main characters. Filming took place from August 15, 2014 till December 12, 2014 and was filmed as the drama aired. First original broadcast began September 3, 2014 on SETTV channel airing weekly from Monday till Friday at 8:00-9:00 pm. Final episode was aired on December 15, 2014 with 74 episodes total.

Synopsis
In Summer 2011 Shi Bo Hai (KunDa Hsieh) asks a stranger to help him pass a message to his girlfriend. That stranger Thomas He Bu Fan (George Hu) meets up with Bo Hai's girlfriend Angel Xu Man Man (Phoebe Yuan) to tell her that Bo Hai wants to break up with her. She becomes so distraught with emotions that she makes a scene in public. To calm her down Bu Fan writes an agreement on a travelers check, that he will marry her if she does not get married by age thirty. Xu Man Man heartbroken leaves with the check in her hand, but what she doesn't know is that Bo Hai was involve in an accident and did not want her to mourn for his death. Three years past and in Autumn 2014, He Bu Fan unsatisfied with his life in the US returns to Taiwan. On his first day back in Taiwan he encounters Xu Man Man on the metro. He does not remember her but she remembers him and shows him the check as she wants him to hold up to his promise three years ago, in attempt to pull a prank on him: He Bu Fan said that he always fulfills his promises.

Cast

Main cast
Both characters appeared in all 74 episodes.
George Hu as Thomas He Bu Fan 
Phoebe Yuan as Angel Xu Man Man

Supporting Cast 
KunDa Hsieh as Shi Bo Hai, Angel Hsu Man Man 's ex boyfriend
Jay Shih as Wang Bai Hao, Tian Xin Ping 's Boyfriend
Smile Weng as Tian Xin Ping, Wang Bai Hao 's Girlfriend
Jet Chao as He Guan Yu, Wang Qian Qian 's husband
Jessie Chang as Wang Qian Qian, He Guan Yu's wife
Amanda Liu as Liu Yi Zhi, Angel Hsu Man Man' s friend
Liao Jun as He Guang Hui, He Bu Fan and He Guan Yu's Father
Jian Chang as Wang Jin Rong, Wang Bai Hao's Father
Grace Ko as Chen Yue Yun, He Bu Fan's aunt
Liao Jin De as Gao Qing Zhì, He Bu Fan and He Guan Yu's cousin
Titan Huang as Shi Di Fen (Steven), a colleague
LeLe as Hsu Le Le, Hsu Man Man 's younger sister
RouRou as Hsu Rou Rou, Hsu Man Man 's younger sister
Shuai Bao as Hsu Tian Tian, Hsu Man Man 's younger brother
Lo Pei An as Hsu Jia Bao, Hsu Man Man's father
Doris Kuang as Qiu Ya Ni, Hsu Man Man's mother
Cherry Hsia as Rebecca Lei Bei Zhi, He Guan Yu 's ex girlfriend
Wang Juan as Tang Ru Juan, He Bu Fan's deceased mother
Lene Lai as Victoria Sun Wei Ya, He Bu Fan's ex girlfriend

Guest cast
Calvin Lee as Don Chen Shao Yang 
Gan De Men as old man Jiang 
Chen Bor-jeng as Moon God 
Rex Wu as Rebecca's affair

Soundtrack
Love Is 愛就是 by George Hu 
I Still Love You 我還是愛著你 by Magic Power 
Secretly 偷偷的 by Magic Power MP
I Don't Think So 我不以為 by Della Ding Dang
I Don't Love You That Much 我沒那麼愛你 by Della Ding Dang 
Better Than Pride 不如驕傲 by Della Ding Dang 
Don't Say Good Bye 別說Good Bye by George Hu 
Unable To Say I Love You 說不出我愛你 by George Hu
What's Next? 接下來是什麼 by Ann Bai 
Sad Stop 悲傷止步 by Yvonne Hsieh 
Correct 無誤 by Yvonne Hsieh

Development and casting
Sanlih held a press conference on July 31, 2014 showcasing their four main in-house contractual lead actors (Lego Lee, Chris Wang, George Hu and Lin Yo Wei) and announcing the upcoming dramas for the later half of 2014 schedule lineup.  
On August 15, 2014 a press conference was held to introduce the three main leads and the plot of the drama. 
A press conference was held on September 2, 2014 at SETTV headquarters auditorium introducing the entire cast of the drama.

Publications
* 26 September 2014 : Iwalker No.05 Oct/Nov 2014 (愛玩客 第5期/2014) - barcode 4717095572690 Sanlih 三立電視 - Author: Sanlih E-Television 三立電視監製 
For the October/November 2014 issue of iwalker magazine, "Love Cheque Charge" lead actors George Hu and Phoebe Yuan are featured on the cover.
* 3 October 2014 : S-Pop Vol. 21 Oct 2014 (華流 10月號/2014) - barcode 4717095578616 - Author: Sanlih E-Television 三立電視監製 
For the October 2014 issue of S-Pop magazine, two of three covers published was devoted to "Love Cheque Charge". Both covers of the magazine are the regular editions published. One cover featured George Hu alone the other feature both Hu and lead actress Phoebe Yuan.

Broadcast

Episode ratings

Awards and nominations

References

External links
Love Cheque Charge SETTV Website  
Love Cheque Charge ETTV Website  

Eastern Television original programming
2014 Taiwanese television series debuts
2014 Taiwanese television series endings
Sanlih E-Television original programming
Taiwanese romance television series